Iryna Oleksiyivna Merleni, née Melnyk, married name Mykulchyn (born 8 February 1982) is a Ukrainian wrestler, who competed in the – 48 kg weight class at the 2004 Summer Olympics and claimed the gold medal. In the same event at the 2008 Summer Olympics, she won a bronze medal. She is a three-time world champion, and won the European championship once.

Merleni was born in Kamianets-Podilskyi, Khmelnytskyi Oblast. In February 2006, she married Andriy Mykulchyn, with whom she has two sons – Artur and Adam. She was inducted into the Women’s Wrestling Hall of Fame in 2023.

References

External links
 

1982 births
People from Kamianets-Podilskyi
Living people
Ukrainian female sport wrestlers
Olympic gold medalists for Ukraine
Olympic bronze medalists for Ukraine
Olympic wrestlers of Ukraine
Wrestlers at the 2004 Summer Olympics
Wrestlers at the 2008 Summer Olympics
Wrestlers at the 2012 Summer Olympics
Olympic medalists in wrestling
Medalists at the 2008 Summer Olympics
Medalists at the 2004 Summer Olympics
World Wrestling Championships medalists
Universiade medalists in wrestling
Universiade gold medalists for Ukraine
Medalists at the 2005 Summer Universiade
Sportspeople from Khmelnytskyi Oblast
20th-century Ukrainian women
21st-century Ukrainian women